"The Heinrich Maneuver" is a song by American rock band Interpol. It was released on May 7, 2007 as the lead single from their third studio album, Our Love to Admire (2007). It was Interpol's first release through Capitol Records after signing with the label. The picture sleeve for the single features a Serval cat.

Sound
Popular music magazine Billboard described the song as "a peppy kiss-off to an ex-love now residing on the opposite coast."

Promotion
The single was released to radio on May 7, 2007. Q101/WKQX Chicago was the first radio station to play "The Heinrich Maneuver", doing so on 27 April 2007 at 6:12pm CDT. The song was played by Steve Lamacq of BBC Radio 1 for the first time on British radio on 7 May 2007. "The Heinrich Maneuver" was also played regularly throughout the band's tour of Canada, along with the new songs "Pioneer to the Falls" and "Mammoth". Bootleg recordings from that tour have been widely circulated on music forums and P2P networks. The single was released as a two-track CD single as well as two separate 7" vinyl singles in the UK on July 2. The song was used in an episode of MTV's The Hills and a 2012 AT&T commercial.

Chart performance
"The Heinrich Maneuver" peaked at number 11 on the Billboard Alternative Songs chart, number 18 on the Billboard Bubbling Under Hot 100 Singles chart, making it their first appearance in the Hot 100, and number 31 on the UK Singles Chart. The song also came in at #98 in the Triple J Hottest 100 of 2007.

Music video
The video for "The Heinrich Maneuver" was released on June 26, 2007. It is a single take of the main character, a woman in a white dress, shown in extreme slow motion applying lipstick and walking towards her demise, being hit by a bus.  This overlays three other characters whose reactions to the event unfold in a mixture of speed altered motion, initially proceeding forward and then reversing. A man taking out his cellphone, a vogue lady screaming, and a waiter running to the scene. The woman featured unwittingly walks in front of a moving bus whose impact is cut short by the screen turning black as the song's outro is cut short.

Track listing

7": Parlophone / CL894 (UK) 
 "The Heinrich Maneuver" (Radio Edit) – 3:28
 "Concert Introduction" – 2:22

7": Parlophone / CLS894 (UK) 
 "The Heinrich Maneuver" (Radio Edit) – 3:28
 "Wrecking Ball" – 4:30

CD: Parlophone / CLCD894 (UK) 
 "The Heinrich Maneuver" (Radio Edit) – 3:28
 "Mammoth" (Instrumental) – 4:16

Charts

Weekly charts

Year-end charts

References

External links

Interpol (band) songs
2007 singles
Song recordings produced by Rich Costey
2007 songs
Capitol Records singles
Songs written by Carlos Dengler
Songs written by Paul Banks (American musician)
Songs written by Sam Fogarino
Songs written by Daniel Kessler (guitarist)